"I've Never Been to Me" is a ballad, written and composed by Ron Miller and Kenneth Hirsch and made popular via a recording by American singer Charlene. Although its original release in 1977 barely registered on the Billboard Hot 100, its re-release in 1982 hit #3 in the US and earned her a gold certification in Australia, where it held the #1 spot for six weeks. In addition, the song topped the charts in Canada (4 weeks), Ireland (3 weeks) and the United Kingdom. It was also a top ten triumph in Norway, Belgium, New Zealand and the Netherlands and became Motown's first top ten hit by a white female solo singer.

Content
The song is best known as lyrically formatted for a female vocalist and as such is addressed to a desperate wife and mother who would like to trade her prosaic existence for the jet setting lifestyle the song's narrator has led. The narrator alludes to various hedonistic episodes in her life, concluding that while she's "been to paradise", she's ultimately failed to find self-fulfillment, expressing this with the line, "I've never been to me." There is also an alternative set of lyrics for the song formatted for a male singer, in which the narrator is an elderly man, destined to die the very next day, begging for a dime for a cup of coffee, addressing a younger man who is "raising hell" the way the old man used to do.

Early versions
Charlene had recorded "I've Never Been to Me" in 1976 for her debut album, the self-titled Charlene, a Prodigal release (P610015S1), and the ballad contained a controversial spoken section. Songs of Love (P610018S1) came out six months later in 1977 and was essentially a re-issue of Charlene, having a slightly different track listing but retaining "I've Never Been to Me" without the spoken bridge. In October 1977, "I've Never Been to Me" became Charlene's third consecutive single to stall in the lowest part of Billboard's Hot 100. From the Charlene LP, the first single, "It Ain't Easy Comin' Down", went to No. 97 in March 1977 (and No. 23 on AC). The following single, "Freddie" from the Songs of Love album, made it to No. 96 on the Hot 100 in May 1977 (and No. 40 on AC). The Hot 100 peak of "I've Never Been to Me" in its original formal release without the monologue was No. 97, and while Charlene's preceding two singles had both reached Billboards Easy Listening chart, "I've Never Been to Me" failed to appear on that chart.

The earliest version of "I've Never Been to Me" to be released was by Randy Crawford which appeared on her 1976 album Everything Must Change. Besides Charlene's version, 1977 also saw the release of versions of the song by Nancy Wilson and Walter Jackson: Nancy Wilson's version served as the title track of her June 1977 album release and was the first version of the song to be released as a single, reaching No. 47 on the Billboards R&B chart, while Walter Jackson's version – featuring the lyric formatted from a male perspective – was featured on his I Want to Come Back as a Song album released in the spring of 1977.

In February 1978, a mid-tempo recording of "I've Never Been to Me" by Mary MacGregor was released as the advance single from her ...In Your Eyes album: this single reached #29 on Billboards Easy Listening and Canada's Adult Contemporary charts. A modified version of MacGregor's version was sent out to radio stations with the possibly controversial line in the final chorus, "I spent my life exploring the subtle whoring that costs too much to be free", amended to "I thought my heart would wait but I learned too late that it costs too much to be free". Also in 1978, Marti Caine recorded "I've Never Been to Me" for her album Behind the Smile from which it was issued as a single, and Mary Roos recorded the German rendering by lyricist Michael Kunze entitled "Doch mich selber kenn ich nicht" ("But I do not know myself") for her album Maryland.

Revival
In 1982, Scott Shannon, a disc jockey at Tampa radio station WRBQ-FM, began playing the "I've Never Been to Me" track off the Charlene album (with the original recitative), and response from local listeners was such as to motivate Shannon, a former Motown employee, to alert Motown president Jay Lasker to the track's hit potential. Lasker located Charlene who, discouraged by the poor performance of her 1977 Motown releases and by the label's decision not to release a second album she had recorded, had left the music industry and met and married an Englishman, subsequently accompanying him to his native land and taking a job at a sweetshop in Ilford. Lasker personally telephoned her with the invitation to re-sign with Motown Records to facilitate the re-release of her "I've Never Been To Me" single, which occurred in February 1982.

The Billboard Hot 100 dated March 6, 1982, showed "I've Never Been to Me" by Charlene debuting at No. 84 – already 13 places higher than its 1977 peak. It subsequently rose as high as No. 3 on the Hot 100, where it held for three weeks during May and June, prevented from further chart movement by "Don't Talk to Strangers" by Rick Springfield and "Ebony and Ivory" by Paul McCartney and Stevie Wonder. The song ranked at No. 38 on the Billboard Hot 100-year-end chart for 1982. The track had even greater impact internationally, attaining No. 1 status in Australia (six weeks), Canada (four weeks), Ireland (three weeks), and the United Kingdom (one week). "I've Never Been to Me" also afforded Charlene a top ten hit in Belgium (Flemish Region) (#7), the Netherlands (#7), New Zealand (#5), and Norway (#5). In 1982, Charlene's "I've Never Been to Me" was also a top 10 hit on Billboard's Adult Contemporary chart (#7) and a minor C&W chart crossover (#60).

When the song was revived in 1982, the version being played on radio was the take with the monologue (from the Prodigal LP Charlene, P6 10015S1); this version was the one Motown re-issued, not the Songs of Love single version from 1977 (Prodigal, P610018S1). The song was never actually re-recorded by Charlene in 1982.

Music video
A music video was made for the song's 1982 reissue. The video was filmed on location at Blickling Hall, Norfolk, England and features Charlene wearing her actual wedding dress from her marriage to Jeff Oliver, whom she had married at the time of the song's revival.

Legacy
As Charlene was unable to successfully follow up the success of "I've Never Been to Me" – her only subsequent Hot 100 entry "Used to Be" (a duet with Stevie Wonder) got as high as No. 46 – she remains a high-profile one-hit wonder. On the 2002 VH1 special 100 Greatest One-Hit Wonders, "I've Never Been to Me" was ranked at No. 75. In the program, it was stated that her entry "expresses the post-'70s hangover."

Chart history

Weekly charts
Nancy Wilson

Charlene

Mary MacGregor

Charlene

Year-end charts

Certifications and sales

Other versions
A Spanish language recording of "I've Never Been to Me" entitled "Nunca He Ido A Mi" was recorded by Charlene and was one of two B-side tracks featured on the re-release of "It Ain't Easy Comin' Down" – the followup to the 1982 release of "I've Never Been to Me" – in its UK format (in other territories "It Ain't Easy Comin' Down" featured only the one B-side "If I Could See Myself"). 

Charlene re-released the song in the form of a dance remix via download music in 2008.

Worst song lists
The song was listed as the No. 3 worst song of all time in Jimmy Guterman's 1991 book "The Worst Rock n' Roll Records of All Time: A Fan's Guide to the Stuff You Love to Hate."
A 2006 CNN poll listed the song as the No. 4 worst song of all time.

References

External links
 

1976 songs
1977 singles
1982 singles
Randy Crawford songs
Charlene (singer) songs
Nancy Wilson (jazz singer) songs
Mary MacGregor songs
Number-one singles in Australia
Irish Singles Chart number-one singles
RPM Top Singles number-one singles
UK Singles Chart number-one singles
Songs written by Ron Miller (songwriter)
Songs written by Ken Hirsch
Motown singles
Pop ballads
1970s ballads